Flyin' Thru (aka Flying Through) is a 1925 American silent Western and aviation film directed by Bruce M. Mitchell and starring Al Wilson, Elinor Fair, and George B. French. The film was written and produced by Al Wilson. Flyin' Thru was one of a series of films that showcased the exploits of the stunt pilots in Hollywood.

Plot
Aviator Lt. Al Wilson returns home from World War I combat duty in France to find his father, a cotton farmer, in jail for the murder of neighbour Jud Blair (George B. French). This was a crime actually committed by dancehall proprietor Melvin Parker (Clarence Burton). Al becomes partners with an ex-sergeant he knew in France, and they buy an aircraft with which they go barnstorming around the country, all the while looking for clues to reveal the real murderer.

At a bullfight across the border, Sybil (Fontaine La Rue), Parker's dancehall sweetheart, becomes infatuated with Al and betrays Parker. Parker flees in an automobile, but Al flies after him, leaps from his aircraft into the speeding automobile, and overcomes Parker. His father is set free, and Al weds Ann (Elinor Fair), Blair's daughter, in an aircraft far above the clouds.

Cast

 Al Wilson as Lt. Wilson
 Elinor Fair as Anne Blair
 George B. French as Judson Blair (Credited as George French)
 James McElhern as Jim Willis
 Clarence Burton as Melvin Parker 
 Fontaine La Rue as Sybil
 Garry O'Dell as Bill Goofus
 Zella Ingraham (uncredited)

Production
Al Wilson was not only the star of Flyin' Thru but he also wrote and produced as  well as flying as a "stunt pilot" in the film. After Wilson became a flying instructor and a short period as manager of the Mercury Aviation Company, founded by one of his students, Cecil B. DeMille, Wilson became more and more skilled in performing stunts, including wing-walking, and left the company to become a professional stunt pilot, specializing in Hollywood aviation films.

Wilson worked together with stuntmen like Frank Tomick, Frank Clarke and Wally Timm and also worked independently for film companies. After numerous appearances in stunt roles, he started his career as an actor in 1923 with the serial The Eagle's Talons.Later in his film career, Wilson worked exclusively with Universal Pictures.

Wilson produced his own movies until 1927, when he went back to work with Universal.

Reception
Aviation film historian Stephen Pendo, in Aviation in the Cinema (1985) said Flyin' Thru was only one of a long list of aviation films that showcased Wilson's talents. He alternately wrote, acted and flew in a career that "spanned more than 10 years, and he acted in more films than any other professional pilot."

References

Notes

Citations

Bibliography

 Pendo, Stephen. Aviation in the Cinema. Lanham, Maryland: Scarecrow Press, 1985. .
 Wynne, H. Hugh. The Motion Picture Stunt Pilots and Hollywood's Classic Aviation Movies. Missoula, Montana: Pictorial Histories Publishing Co., 1987. .

External links 
 
 
 

1925 films
Universal Pictures films
American aviation films
1925 Western (genre) films
American black-and-white films
Silent American Western (genre) films
Films directed by Bruce M. Mitchell
1920s American films
1920s English-language films